San Nicolás de Bari Airport  is an airport serving San Nicolás de Bari, a municipality of the Mayabeque Province in Cuba.

Facilities

References

Airports in Cuba
Buildings and structures in Mayabeque Province